The University of California, San Diego (UC San Diego or colloquially, UCSD) is a public land-grant research university in La Jolla, California. Established in 1960 near the pre-existing Scripps Institution of Oceanography, UC San Diego is the southernmost of the ten campuses of the University of California, and offers over 200 undergraduate and graduate degree programs, enrolling 33,096 undergraduate and 9,872 graduate students. UC San Diego is ranked among the best universities in the world by major college and university rankings.

UC San Diego consists of twelve undergraduate, graduate and professional schools as well as seven undergraduate residential colleges. It received over 140,000 applications for undergraduate admissions in Fall 2021, making it the second most applied-to university in the United States. UC San Diego Health, the region's only academic health system, provides patient care, conducts medical research and educates future health care professionals at the UC San Diego Medical Center, Hillcrest, Jacobs Medical Center, Moores Cancer Center, Sulpizio Cardiovascular Center, Shiley Eye Institute, Institute for Genomic Medicine, Koman Family Outpatient Pavilion and various express care and urgent care clinics throughout San Diego.

The university operates 19 organized research units as well as eight School of Medicine research units, six research centers at Scripps Institution of Oceanography and two multi-campus initiatives. UC San Diego is also closely affiliated with several regional research centers, such as the Salk Institute, the Sanford Burnham Prebys Medical Discovery Institute, the Sanford Consortium for Regenerative Medicine, and the Scripps Research Institute. It is classified among "R1: Doctoral Universities – Very high research activity". According to the National Science Foundation, UC San Diego spent $1.403 billion on research and development in fiscal year 2021, giving it the second-highest R&D spending in the University of California system and the 7th-highest in the nation.

UC San Diego is considered one of the United States's Public Ivies. UC San Diego faculty, researchers, and alumni have won 27 Nobel Prizes as well as three Fields Medals, eight National Medals of Science, eight MacArthur Fellowships, and three Pulitzer Prizes. Additionally, of the current faculty, 29 have been elected to the National Academy of Engineering, 70 to the National Academy of Sciences, 45 to the Institute of Medicine and 110 to the American Academy of Arts and Sciences.

History
When the Regents of the University of California originally authorized the San Diego campus in 1956, it was planned to be a graduate and research institution, providing instruction in the sciences, mathematics, and engineering. Local citizens supported the idea, voting the same year to transfer to the university  of mesa land on the coast near the preexisting Scripps Institution of Oceanography. This outraged local conservatives, as well as Regent Edwin W. Pauley. Revelle also got involved in a bitter debate with Jonas Salk over where Salk's proposed institute would be located relative to the new campus.UC President Clark Kerr satisfied San Diego city donors by changing the proposed name from University of California, La Jolla, to University of California, San Diego. The city voted to agree to its part of the deal in 1958, and the UC Board of Regents approved construction of the new campus in 1960. Because Revelle's tactless approaches to the clashes with Pauley and Salk had damaged his reputation with the Board of Regents, Kerr realized he could not nominate Revelle as the campus's first chancellor. Revelle's nomination would have become "an angry and drawn-out affair" and greatly detracted from the campus's future development. Herbert York, first director of Lawrence Livermore National Laboratory, was selected instead. York planned the main campus according to the "Oxbridge" model, relying on many of Revelle's ideas.
According to Kerr, "San Diego always asked for the best," though this created much friction throughout the UC system, including with Kerr himself, because UC San Diego often seemed to be "asking for too much and too fast."  Kerr attributed UC San Diego's "special personality" to Scripps, which for over five decades had been the most isolated UC unit in every sense: geographically, financially, and institutionally.  It was a great shock to the Scripps community to learn that Scripps was now expected to become the nucleus of a new UC campus and would now be the object of far more attention from both the university administration in Berkeley and the state government in Sacramento.

UC San Diego was the first general campus of the University of California to be designed "from the top down" in terms of research emphasis. Local leaders disagreed on whether the new school should be a technical research institute or a more broadly based school that included undergraduates as well. John Jay Hopkins of General Dynamics Corporation pledged one million dollars for the former while the City Council offered free land for the latter. The original authorization for the San Diego campus given by the UC Regents in 1956 approved a "graduate program in science and technology" that included undergraduate programs, a compromise that won both the support of General Dynamics and the city voters' approval.

Nobel laureate Harold Urey, a physicist from the University of Chicago, and Hans Suess, who had published the first paper on the greenhouse effect with Revelle in the previous year, were early recruits to the faculty in 1958. Maria Goeppert-Mayer, later the second female Nobel laureate in physics, was appointed professor of physics in 1960. The graduate division of the school opened in 1960 with 20 faculty in residence, with instruction offered in the fields of physics, biology, chemistry, and earth science. Before the main campus completed construction, classes were held in the Scripps Institution of Oceanography.

By 1963, new facilities on the mesa had been finished for the School of Science and Engineering, and new buildings were under construction for Social Sciences and Humanities. Ten additional faculty in those disciplines were hired, and the whole site was designated the First College of the new campus (it was later renamed after Roger Revelle). York resigned as chancellor that year and was replaced by John Semple Galbraith. The undergraduate program accepted its first class of 181 freshman at Revelle College in 1964. Second College was founded in 1964, on the land deeded by the federal government, and named after environmentalist John Muir two years later. The School of Medicine also accepted its first students in 1966.

Political theorist Herbert Marcuse joined the faculty in 1965. A champion of the New Left, he reportedly was the first protester to occupy the administration building in a demonstration organized by his student, political activist Angela Davis. The American Legion offered to buy out the remainder of Marcuse's contract for $20,000; the Regents censured Chancellor William J. McGill for defending Marcuse on the basis of academic freedom, but further action was averted after local leaders expressed support for Marcuse. Further student unrest was felt at the university, as the United States increased its involvement in the Vietnam War during the mid-1960s, when a student raised a Viet Minh flag over the campus. Protests escalated as the war continued and were only exacerbated after the National Guard fired on student protesters at Kent State University in 1970. Over 200 students occupied Urey Hall, with one student setting himself on fire in protest of the war.

Early research activity and faculty quality, notably in the sciences, was integral to shaping the focus and culture of the university. Even before UC San Diego had its own campus, faculty recruits had already made significant research breakthroughs, such as the Keeling Curve, a graph that plots rapidly increasing carbon dioxide levels in the atmosphere and was the first significant evidence for global climate change; the Kohn–Sham equations, used to investigate particular atoms and molecules in quantum chemistry; and the Miller–Urey experiment, which gave birth to the field of prebiotic chemistry.

Engineering, particularly computer science, became an important part of the university's academics as it matured. University researchers helped develop UCSD Pascal, an early machine-independent programming language that later heavily influenced Java; the National Science Foundation Network, a precursor to the Internet; and the Network News Transfer Protocol during the late 1970s to 1980s.

Under Richard C. Atkinson's leadership as chancellor from 1980 to 1995, the university strengthened its ties with the city of San Diego by encouraging technology transfer with developing companies, transforming San Diego into a world leader in technology-based industries. He oversaw a rapid expansion of the School of Engineering, later renamed after Qualcomm founder Irwin M. Jacobs, with the construction of the San Diego Supercomputer Center and establishment of the computer science, electrical engineering, and bioengineering departments. Private donations increased from $15 million to nearly $50 million annually, faculty expanded by nearly 50%, and enrollment doubled to about 18,000 students during his administration. By the end of his chancellorship, the quality of UC San Diego graduate programs was ranked 10th in the nation by the National Research Council.

The university continued to undergo further expansion during the first decade of the new millennium with the establishment and construction of two new professional schools — the Skaggs School of Pharmacy and Rady School of Management—and the California Institute for Telecommunications and Information Technology, a research institute run jointly with UC Irvine. UC San Diego also reached two financial milestones during this time, becoming the first university in the western region to raise over $1 billion in its eight-year fundraising campaign in 2007 and also obtaining an additional $1 billion through research contracts and grants in a single fiscal year for the first time in 2010. Despite this, due to the California budget crisis, the university loaned $40 million against its own assets in 2009 to offset a significant reduction in state educational appropriations. The salary of Pradeep Khosla, who became chancellor in 2012, has been the subject of controversy amidst continued budget cuts and tuition increases. In 2012, campus launched a 10-year, $2 billion fundraising campaign, which the campus completed 3 years early in 2019, making it the youngest university in the United States to have completed a $2 billion fundraiser.

On November 27, 2017, the university announced it would leave its longtime athletic home of the California Collegiate Athletic Association, an NCAA Division II league, to begin a transition to Division I in 2020. It joined the Big West Conference, already home to four other UC campuses (Davis, Irvine, Riverside, Santa Barbara). The university transitioned to NCAA Division I competition on July 1, 2020. The transition period will run through the 2023–24 school year.

Campus

UC San Diego is located in the residential neighborhood of La Jolla of northern San Diego, bordered by the communities of La Jolla Shores, Torrey Pines, and University City. The San Diego Freeway passes through the campus and separates Jacobs Medical Center and Mesa apartment housing from the greater part of the university. The Preuss School, a college-preparatory charter school established and administered by UC San Diego, also lies on the eastern portion of the campus.

Standing at the center of the university is the iconic Geisel Library, named after Dr. Seuss following a $20 million donation from his wife Audrey. Library Walk, a heavily traveled pathway leading from the library to Gilman Drive, lies adjacent or close to Price Center, Center Hall, International Center, and various student services buildings, including the Student Services Center and the Career Services building. The layout of the main campus centers on Geisel Library, which is roughly surrounded by the seven residential colleges of Revelle, Muir, Marshall, Warren, Roosevelt, Sixth, Seventh, and the School of Medicine. The seven colleges maintain separate housing facilities for their students and each college's buildings are differentiated by distinct architectural styles. As residential colleges were added while the university expanded, buildings in newer colleges were designed with styles that were starkly different from that of the original campus. The disparate architectural styles led Travel + Leisure, in its October 2013 issue, to name the university as one of the ugliest campuses in America, likening it to "a cupboard full of kitchen appliances whose function you can't quite fathom."

In addition to its academic and housing facilities, the campus features eucalyptus groves, the Birch Aquarium and museum, and several major research centers. The Scripps Institution owns a sea port and several open ocean vessels for marine research. Several large shake facilities, including the world record holding Large High Performance Outdoor Shake Table, used for earthquake simulations, are also maintained by the university.

The university has actively sought to reduce carbon emissions and energy usage on campus, earning a "gold" sustainability performance rating in the Sustainability Tracking Assessment and Rating System (STARS) survey. It was also praised in The Princeton Review's Guide to 322 Green Colleges: 2013 Edition for its strong commitment to sustainability in its academic offerings, campus infrastructure, activities and career preparation.

Academic facilities

When the campus opened in 1964, it consisted only of Revelle College and Scripps Institution of Oceanography. The school's rapid increase in enrollment and opening to undergraduate students over its first decade spurred major campus expansion. Muir, Marshall, and Warren Colleges were established and built during the late 1960s through 1980s as the student population continued to grow considerably. Initially, the campus followed a rough north–south axis alongside Historic Route 101, though construction in the following decades deviated from this, with the core of the campus shifting towards Geisel Library.

The school's two engineering departments were merged into the School of Engineering (renamed the Jacobs School of Engineering in 1987 in honor of Irwin Jacobs, founder of Qualcomm, and his wife Joan Jacobs) in 1982. New buildings have been continually added as the division expands. Major additions include: the San Diego Supercomputer Center, completed in 1986; Powell-Focht Bioengineering Hall, completed in 2003; and the Structural and Materials Engineering building, completed in 2012. Significant construction work on the previously undeveloped northern part of campus also took place during this time. Two graduate professional schools, the School of Global Policy and Strategy and Rady School of Management, were constructed in the area adjacent to and near the Supercomputer Center, as well as Roosevelt College, a transfer student apartment complex called The Village at Torrey Pines, and the RIMAC athletic facilities.

Arts facilities 
UC San Diego's Joan and Irwin Jacobs Theatre District, located just south of Revelle College, houses the Mandell Weiss Center for the Performing Arts. The center's facilities are shared with the La Jolla Playhouse, a professional theatre which UC San Diego is partnered with. Specifically, four large performance venues are shared between the two organizations: the Mandell Weiss Forum, the Mandell Weiss Theatre, the Sheila and Hughes Potiker Theatre, and the Theodore and Adele Shank Theatre. These venues, on top of hosting UC San Diego Theatre and Dance departmental undergraduate and graduate productions, often host professional productions of plays and musicals, some of which later transfer to Broadway. Other theatre performance facilities at UC San Diego include the Molli and Arthur Wagner Dance Building, also located within the Theatre District, and the Arthur Wagner Theatre located in Revelle College's Galbraith Hall.

Other arts facilities include the 800-seat Mandeville Auditorium and Conrad Prebys Music Center are used by UC San Diego's music department, as well as Mandeville Center, the Visual Arts Facilities (VAF) building, and the Structural and Material Engineerings (SME) building, used by UC San Diego's visual arts department.

Public art

More than a dozen public art projects, part of the Stuart Collection, decorate the campus. Perhaps the most famous of these is the Sun God, a large winged creature by Niki de Saint Phalle located near the Faculty Club. Other collection pieces include Richard Fleischner's La Jolla Project (a collection of Stonehenge-like stone blocks), Do Ho Suh's Fallen Star (a house sitting atop an engineering building in Warren College), a table by Jenny Holzer, an installation by Bruce Nauman on the Powell Structural Systems Laboratory titled Vices and Virtues, and three metallic Eucalyptus trees by Terry Allen.

The collection also includes a work by Alexis Smith consisting of a path made of a large coiling snake whose head guides towards Geisel Library, with a quote from John Milton's Paradise Lost carved along its length: "And wilt thou not be loath to leave this Paradise, but shalt possess a Paradise within thee, happier far." The path circles around its own garden and a large granite book-shaped block. One of the newest additions to the collection is Tim Hawkinson's giant teddy bear made of six boulders located in between the newly constructed Calit2 buildings. Another notable campus sight was the graffiti staircase of Mandeville Hall, a series of corridors that had been tagged with graffiti by generations of students over decades of use; this was recently replaced with the Graffiti Art Park. Students in the university's visual arts department also create temporary public art installations as part of their coursework. The university is sponsoring a $56,000 performance art project to develop a sense of community at the sprawling campus.

Shepard Fairey, most notable for his Barack Obama "Hope" poster, painted a mural at the Ché Café, one of UC San Diego's most famous buildings and collectives, on an outside wall facing Scholars Drive, that features the likenesses of Martin Luther King Jr. and other political figures. Underground street artist, Swampy, created a large piece inside the Ché Café, visible through the courtyard depicting his signature mammoth skeleton. Local San Diego artist Mario Torero, in collaboration with university art students, painted a mural at the Café in commemoration of Angela Davis and Rigoberta Menchú, along with other notable political figures. The Ché Café remains a hub for underground and politically progressive artists. Torero was invited back to the university in 2009 to create a mural called "Chicano Legacy" based on content suggested by Chicano students. The mural is a $10,000 digital image on a  canvas mounted on the exterior of Peterson Hall, which includes representations of César Chávez and Dolores Huerta as well as the kiosk structure at Chicano Park. In 2016 a mural entitled "Enduring Spell" was completed by El Mac in the Argo courtyard,

Transportation
UC San Diego maintains about 17,000 parking spaces and offers a number of alternative transportation options. The university runs a shuttle system, which is provided free for students, faculty, and staff, that services the main campus, UC San Diego Medical Center, university affiliated research centers, nearby apartment complexes and shopping centers in University City, and the Sorrento Valley train station. As part of a greater initiative to reduce the university's impact on the environment, a portion of the shuttle fleet has been refitted to exclusively use biodiesel fuel derived from vegetable oil. UC San Diego also reserves parking spaces for carpools, maintains a fleet of on-campus Zipcars, and provides free bike rentals.

Additionally, since November 21, 2021, the University can be accessed by the San Diego Trolley. On that day, the existing Blue Line was extended north from Downtown San Diego to UC San Diego and the University City area. The extension gave the campus two trolley stations: UC San Diego Health La Jolla and UC San Diego Central Campus. A major goal of the project is to ease traffic and parking on campus while providing more accessible transportation to nearby areas. Construction began in 2016, with the line in service in November 2021. As part of UC San Diego's existing public transit partnerships, all students have unlimited access to MTS regional buses and trolleys, as well as most North County Transit District transportation services upon paying a "transportation fee" in registration.

Construction 
Several facilities are currently under construction at the UC San Diego campus. The North Torrey Pines Living and Learning Neighborhood is completed, with students living in the completed facilities since Fall 2020. The Theatre District Living and Learning Neighborhood is scheduled to open in Fall 2023.

There is also significant infrastructure construction, including the UC San Diego Central Campus Station and UC San Diego Health La Jolla trolley stations, which will be connected from campus to the Downtown San Diego area.

Academics and administration
UC San Diego is a large, primarily residential, public research university accredited by the Western Association of Schools and Colleges that offers a four-year Bachelor of Arts and Bachelor of Science degree to undergraduate students. The full-time undergraduate program comprises the majority of enrollments at the university. The university offers 125 bachelor's degree programs organized into five disciplinary divisions: arts and humanities, biological sciences, engineering, mathematics and physical sciences, and social sciences. Students are also free to design special majors or engage in dual majors. 38% of undergraduates major in the social sciences, followed by 25% in biological sciences, 18% in engineering, 8% in sciences and math, 4% in humanities, and 3% in the arts.

UC San Diego's comprehensive graduate program is composed of several divisions and professional schools, including the Scripps Institution of Oceanography, School of Medicine, Institute of Engineering in Medicine, School of Global Policy and Strategy, Jacobs School of Engineering, Rady School of Management, and Skaggs School of Pharmacy. The university offers 35 masters programs, 47 doctoral programs, five professional programs, and nine joint doctoral programs with San Diego State University and other UC campuses. UC San Diego has highly ranked graduate programs in biological sciences and medicine, economics, social and behavioral sciences, physics, and computer engineering.

The university also offers a continuing and public education program through UC San Diego Extension. Approximately 50,000 enrollees per year are educated in this branch of the university, which offers over 100 professional and specialized certificate programs. Courses are offered at Extension facilities, located both on the main campus and off-campus, and also online. UC San Diego Extension offers programs in Arts & Humanities, Business & Leadership, Data Analysis & Mathematics, Digital Arts, Education, Engineering, Environment & Sustainability, International Programs, Languages, Law, Occupational Safety & Health, Pre-College, Sciences, Technology, and Writing, as well as public programs such as the UC San Diego Osher Lifelong Learning Institute and the Helen Edison Lecture Series. UC San Diego Extension also plans to open a 66,000-square-foot hub at the corner of Park Boulevard and Market Street in East Village referred to as the Innovative Cultural and Education Hub. The project is slated to be completed in 2020 and plans to "advance the burgeoning tech ecosystem downtown, contribute to the city's lively arts and culture scene, and connect in multiple ways with diverse neighborhoods such as Barrio Logan, the Diamond District, and Golden Hill."

Residential colleges

UC San Diego's undergraduate division is organized into seven residential colleges, each headed by its own provost. They all set their own general education requirements, manage separate administrative and advising staff, and grant unique degrees. In chronological order by date of foundation, the seven colleges are:
 Revelle College, founded in 1964 as First College, emphasizes a "Renaissance education" through the Humanities sequence which integrates history, literature, and philosophy. It has highly structured requirements.
 John Muir College, founded in 1967 as Second College, emphasizes a "spirit of self-sufficiency and individual choice" and offers loosely structured general-education requirements.
 Thurgood Marshall College, founded in 1970 as Third College, emphasizes "scholarship, social responsibility and the belief that a liberal arts education must include an understanding of one's role in society".
 Earl Warren College, founded in 1974 as Fourth College, requires students to pursue a major of their choice while also requiring two "programs of concentration" in disciplines unrelated to each other and their major "toward a life in balance".
 Eleanor Roosevelt College, founded in 1988 as Fifth College, focuses its core education program on a cross-cultural interdisciplinary course sequence entitled "Making of the Modern World", has a foreign language requirement, and encourages studying abroad.
 Sixth College, founded in 2001, has a focus on "historical and philosophical connections among culture, art, and technology."
 Seventh College, founded in 2020, enrolled its first cohort of students in Fall 2020, with the theme "A Changing Planet."
 Eighth College, founded in 2021, will enroll its first cohort of students in Fall 2023, with the theme of "Engagement & Community"

Students affiliate with a college based upon its particular philosophy and environment as majors are not exclusive to specific colleges. Revelle and Sixth enroll the largest number of undergraduate students, followed by Warren, Muir, Roosevelt, and Marshall. Each undergraduate college sets different requirements for awarding graduation and provost's honors, separate from departmental and Phi Beta Kappa honors.

Governance

As one of the 10 general campuses of the University of California system, UC San Diego is governed by a 26-member Board of Regents consisting of 18 officials appointed by the Governor of California, seven ex officio members, and a single student regent. The current president of the University of California is Michael Drake, and the administrative head of UC San Diego is Pradeep Khosla. Academic policies are set by the school's Academic Senate, a legislative body composed of all university faculty members. Nine vice chancellors manage academic affairs, research, diversity, marine sciences, student affairs, planning, external relations, business affairs, and health sciences and report directly to the chancellor.

Research 

The Nature Index lists UC San Diego as 6th in the United States for research output by article count in 2019. In 2020, UC San Diego spent $1.403 billion on research, the 6th highest expenditure among academic institutions in the United States. The university operates several organized research units, including the Center for Astrophysics and Space Sciences (CASS), the Center for Drug Discovery Innovation, and the Institute for Neural Computation. UC San Diego also maintains close ties to the nearby Scripps Research and Salk Institute for Biological Studies. In 1977, UC San Diego developed and released the UCSD Pascal programming language. The university was designated as one of the original national Alzheimer's disease research centers in 1984 by the National Institute on Aging. In 2018, UC San Diego received $10.5 million from the National Nuclear Security Administration to establish the Center for Matters under Extreme Pressure (CMEC).

The university founded the San Diego Supercomputer Center (SDSC) in 1985, which provides high-performance computing for research in various scientific disciplines. In 2000, UC San Diego partnered with UC Irvine to create the Qualcomm Institute, which integrates research in photonics, nanotechnology, and wireless telecommunication to develop solutions to problems in energy, health, and the environment.

UC San Diego also operates the Scripps Institution of Oceanography (SIO), one of the largest centers of research in earth science in the world, which predates the university itself. Together, SDSC and SIO, along with funding partner universities Caltech, SDSU, and UC Santa Barbara,  manage the High Performance Wireless Research and Education Network.

Rankings

National rankings
UC San Diego is ranked 5th as Best Public University by Academic Ranking of World Universities and 16th in the U.S. by the Center for World University Rankings. Washington Monthly ranked the university 12th in its 2021 National University ranking, based on its contribution to the public good as measured by social mobility, research, and promoting public service. UC San Diego ranked fifth in the nation in terms of research and development expenditures in 2018, with $1.265 billion spent. Kiplinger in 2014 ranked UC San Diego 14th out of the top 100 best-value public colleges and universities in the nation, and 3rd in California. UC San Diego was ranked tied for 35th among national universities in the United States and tied for 8th among public universities by U.S. News & World Report'''s 2021 rankings. ScienceWatch ranks UC San Diego 7th of federally funded U.S. universities, based on the citation impact of their published research in major fields of science and the social sciences and 12th globally by volume of citations.

Global rankings

Recognized as a Public Ivy, UC San Diego is a highly regarded research institution, ranked 11th in the world by the Nature Index, 14th in the world by the Scrimago Institutions Rankings, 14th in the world by the Lens Metric, 14th best university in the world according to TBS Rankings, 16th in U.S. News & World Reports 2017 global university rankings, 15th in the world by the Academic Ranking of World Universities, 16th best university in the world by the Centre for Science and Technology Studies of Leiden University Ranking, 18th in the world by the Center for World University Rankings, 18th in the world by University Ranking by Academic Performance, and 5th best public university in the world by the Times Higher Education World University Rankings.

The University of California San Diego is ranked 15th by the Academic Ranking of World Universities, and is ranked 17th "Best University in the World" by the Center for World University Rankings for 2016. U.S. News & World Report named UC San Diego the 15th best university in the world for 2017 for research, global and regional reputation, international collaboration, and several highly cited papers. In 2017, UC San Diego was ranked 30th in the world by the Times Higher Education World University Rankings. UC San Diego was also ranked 38th overall in the world, and 11th in biological sciences, 16th in life sciences, and medicine, 19th in economics and econometrics, 31st in mathematics, and 44th in computer science and information systems by QS World University Rankings. In 2015, the Centre for Science and Technology Studies at Leiden University named UC San Diego 16th in the world for scientific impact.

Graduate school rankings
The UC San Diego School of Medicine is ranked tied for 18th for research and 12th for primary care in the 2018 U.S. News & World Report rankings. The Rady School of Management at UC San Diego is ranked 17th in the world for faculty research and 8th for alumni entrepreneurship in the 2014 Financial Times’ Global MBA. In 2014 the Rady School ranked 1st in the nation in intellectual capital by Bloomberg Businessweek, which measured faculty research published in the top 20 business journals from 2009 to 2013. UC San Diego was named 8th in the nation among doctoral institutions for the number of students who study abroad for a full academic year, according to the Institute of International Education Open Doors report. Three doctoral programs at UC San Diego—biological sciences, bioengineering, and Scripps Institution of Oceanography—are 1st in the nation in the National Research Council's Data-Based Assessment of Research-Doctorate Programs report.

Departmental rankings
Departmental rankings (including specialties) in the national top 10 according to the 2018 U.S. News & World Report Best Graduate Schools report include biomedical engineering/bioengineering (2nd);  neuroscience/neurobiology (2nd); biochemistry (10th); discrete mathematics and combinatorics (3rd); plasma physics (7th); econometrics (4th); public finance (8th); political science (9th); international politics (4th); comparative politics (4th); behavioral neuroscience (4th); cognitive psychology (8th); and time-based media/new media (3rd).

Departmental rankings in the global top 10 according to the 2015 U.S. News & World Report Best Graduate Schools report include: biology and biochemistry (6th); molecular biology and genetics (8th); neuroscience and behavior (6th); pharmacology and toxicology (5th); and psychiatry and psychology (8th).

Departmental rankings in the global top 20 according to the Academic Ranking of World Universities (ARWU) for 2015 include chemistry (18th); computer science (14th); and economics/business (19th). Since introduced in 2017, the ARWU Subject Rankings has ranked mechanical engineering at UC San Diego as the top (1st) public university program in the US (2017–2020). Mechanical engineering at UC San Diego has also consistently ranked as a top 5 US overall and a top 10 program worldwide since the introduction of subject rankings by ARWU.

Departmental rankings in the global top 20 according to the QS World University Rankings for 2015 include earth and marine sciences (13th); biological sciences (14th); economics and econometrics (18th); and pharmacy and pharmacology (20th). Additional rankings within the global top 40 include politics and international studies (21st); medicine (22nd); mathematics (28th); linguistics (31st); and electrical engineering (34th).ScienceWatch placed UC San Diego 1st in social psychology, 2nd in oceanography, 3rd in international relations, 5th in molecular biology and genetics, 17th in engineering, and 18th in Neuroscience and Behavior using non-survey, quantitative based metrics to determine research impact.The Hollywood Reporter has ranked UC San Diego's graduate theatre program among the top ten drama schools in 2016 (6th), 2017 (5th), 2018 (4th), 2019 (3rd), 2020 (3rd), and 2021 (5th) also ranking the undergraduate theatre program as one of the top five in the nation in 2018.25 Best Drama Schools for an Acting Degree , The Hollywood Reporter, Retrieved May 26, 2017

Admissions

UC San Diego is categorized by U.S. News & World Report as "most selective" for college admissions ratings within the United States. For the Fall 2018 admissions cycle, the school received 118,372 applications from both freshman and transfer applicants, the second highest among the University of California campuses. Of those 118,372 applications, 97,899 applications were from prospective freshman with UC San Diego granting admission to just 29,577 applicants giving the institution an acceptance rate of 30.2% for the fall 2018 admission cycle.

In 2009, UC San Diego mistakenly sent Admit Day welcome emails to all its 47,000 freshmen applicants, instead of just the 17,000 who had been admitted. However, school officials quickly realized the mistake and sent an apology email within two hours.

Graduate admissions are largely centralized through the Office of Graduate Studies. However, the Rady School of Management, Scripps Institution of Oceanography, and the School of Global Policy and Strategy (GPS) handle their own admissions. For Fall 2012, the UC San Diego School of Medicine offered admission to 5% of its applicants.

Student life

In all, the university offers classical orchestras, intramural sports, and over 550 student organizations. 38 national and local Greek organizations are hosted on campus, with fraternity and sorority members representing 20% of the student population. The university operates on an academic quarter system, with three primary quarters beginning in late September and ending in mid-June. 44% of undergraduate students receive federal Pell Grants.

The undergraduate student body government is the Associated Students of the University of California, San Diego, organized as a cabinet and senate,ASUCSD Minutes, December 16, 1964 while graduate students are represented by the Graduate Student Association, a proportional representative body with membership depending on the number of students in each graduate department. Additionally, graduate students who serve as teaching assistants are represented by the UC-wide union of Academic Student Employees. Each of the seven residential colleges has its own student council as well. Most student media publications distributed on-campus are services provided and governed by ASUCSD, including Triton Television, the school's student run film studio, and the KSDT radio station. A notable exception is The Guardian, which is directly governed by the university's Student Affairs department.

Price Center, often referred to as PC, is the main student hub and is located in the center of campus, just south of Geisel Library. The building houses multiple restaurants, the central bookstore, a movie theater, and office space for student organizations, organization advisers, and university faculty. A student referendum was passed in 2003 to expand the Price Center to nearly double its original size. The Price Center East expansion was officially opened to the public on May 19, 2008.

There are also three campus centers that cultivate a sense of community among faculty, staff, and certain students: the Cross-Cultural Center, the Women's Center, and the LGBT Resource Center. UC San Diego was the last UC campus to have such centers. All three, especially the Cross-Cultural Center that was created first, were founded in the mid-1990s as a result of student movements that demanded change despite opposition by the campus administration.

The Ché Café is a student worker cooperative and social center that is perhaps best known for its role as a venue for underground music scene. It is an on-and-off again vegan cafe and catering operation as well. The Ché also acts as a resource for the music and art departments on campus through hosting art shows, performances, and film screenings. Some of the most notable touring bands or musicians who have played at the Ché include: Bon Iver, Green Day, Rise Against, Jimmy Eat World, Matt & Kim, Billy Corgan, Blonde Redhead, Bomb the Music Industry!, The Get Up Kids, Deerhoof, Bright Eyes, Chumbawamba, Mike Watt, Hella, Dan Deacon, Unwound, and Jawbreaker. Prominent local San Diego bands such as The Locust and Pinback, and national tours such as Mates of State and The Dillinger Escape Plan have given the Ché Café some fame and praise as a radical vegan collective despite its small size and limited sound equipment.

Traditions
The student body government coordinates a wide variety of concerts and events during the year. UC San Diego begins the fall quarter with Welcome Week to introduce new students to campus clubs and activities, starting the week with the All Campus Dance. The Hullabaloo music festival takes place every November as part of the university's Founders' Celebration. Bear Garden, a carnival held near Price Center, takes place every quarter throughout the year. Additionally, events are frequently held at the Loft, a performance lounge within Price Center.

The Sun God Festival, named after the statue part of the Stuart Collection, is the largest and most significant event of the year, held annually in mid-May on the seventh week of the spring quarter. The festival has grown over its 30-year history into a 20,000 person event, featuring an eclectic mix of art, dance, and musical performances. Past performers have included: Kendrick Lamar, Porter Robinson, Macklemore, Silversun Pickups, Wiz Khalifa, Drake, T.I., Third Eye Blind, Ludacris, Michelle Branch, Sara Bareilles, The Roots, My Chemical Romance, and Joji. The 2017 festival featured ScHoolboy Q, DJ Mustard, Bad Suns, Manila Killa and Khalid.

Two other popular campus traditions are the Pumpkin Drop and the Watermelon Drop, which take place during Halloween and at the end of the spring quarter, respectively. The Watermelon Drop is one of the campus' oldest traditions, famously originating in 1965 from a physics exam question centering on the velocity on impact of a dropped object. A group of intrigued students pursued that line of thought by dropping a watermelon from the top floor of Revelle's Urey Hall to measure the distance from the splat to the farthest travelling piece of fruit. A variety of events surround the Watermelon Drop, including a pageant where an occasionally male but generally female "Watermelon Queen" is elected. The Pumpkin Drop is a similar event celebrated by the dropping of a large, candy-filled pumpkin from 11-story Tioga Hall, the tallest residential building on the Muir college campus.

Housing
The seven undergraduate residential colleges have separate, unique housing facilities for their students. First-year students are usually housed in the residence halls while upperclassmen live in the college apartments. Transfer students are housed in separate facilities from the residential colleges, in an area called The Village at Pepper Canyon. The housing facilities vary in design, though nearly all of them are of modern or brutalist style. The vast majority of entering freshmen and about 40 percent of all undergraduates in Fall 2012 chose to live in campus residence halls or apartments. Graduate students can choose to live in one of six apartment complexes apart from undergraduate housing. Three of these facilities are several minutes away from UC San Diego while the remaining are located on university grounds. Each residential college comes with a separate unique philosophy, general education writing sequence and events on top of having separate housing facilities.

Accommodations are made for students with specific needs. Undergraduate couples and families have the option of living in housing facilities that are normally available only to graduate students. The university also dedicates a portion of its facilities for those who wish to live in gender-neutral or LGBT housing.

Reflecting UC San Diego's diversity, International House, a complex of apartments located in Eleanor Roosevelt College, is dedicated to cross-cultural exchange between American and international students, housing about 350 students from more than 30 countries. International learning is fostered through formal programs including current affairs discussions, cultural nights, and a community newsletter. Upper-division undergraduates from all seven colleges, graduate students, faculty, and researchers are eligible to live in International House, located in the Eleanor Roosevelt College townhouses. Demand is very high for this special program and there is often a waitlist. Spaces in International House are not guaranteed and admission requires a separate application.

Housing plans also offer students access to dining facilities, which were named by PETA as the most vegan-friendly in the United States. Each student is allotted a certain number of "Dining Dollars" to purchase meals at any dining hall and groceries at any on-campus market. Distinct dining halls are located at each of the seven colleges, with markets located adjacent or near them, except at Eleanor Roosevelt College which shares a marketplace with Seventh College. In addition to the dining halls, there are also four specialty dining facilities and two food trucks on campus that accept dining dollars. UC San Diego currently offers two years guaranteed housing to both its incoming freshmen and its incoming transfer students. The university intends to reach a capacity that will enable them to offer a four-year housing guarantee.

Greek life
UC San Diego boasts a large Greek community and supports several fraternities and sororities, each belonging to one of three different governing councils. Social fraternities belong to the Interfraternity Council, while social sororities belong to the Panhellenic Council.

The university also sponsors a Multicultural Greek Council (MGC), which currently recognizes 8 fraternities and 7 sororities.

Greek life at UC San Diego is unique in comparison to other universities in that Greek organizations do not have chapter houses.

Athletics

On November 27, 2017, the university announced that its athletic programs have begun a 6-year transition process from NCAA Division II to Division I, where it will be a member of the Big West Conference. As of 2017 most of UC San Diego's 23 intercollegiate varsity athletic teams still participate in Division II, 12-member California Collegiate Athletic Association, and some compete independently. The water polo, fencing, and men's volleyball teams compete as part of Division I conferences. Before joining Division II in 2000, the school participated at the Division III level. The teams compete at the university's RIMAC facility, Triton Ballpark, and RIMAC Arena. University of California, San Diego was ranked #1 among all NCAA D2 schools in the country and #40 overall (for all divisions), according to the Next College Student Athlete's 2018 NCSA Power Rankings. The NCSA Power Rankings recognize the best colleges and universities in the U.S. for student-athletes. UC San Diego athletics also ranked #1 in men's and women's soccer, women's volleyball, men's and women's basketball, men's and women's swimming, men's and women's track and field, men's and women's tennis, men's golf, women's rowing, softball, and baseball, among all NCAA D2 schools. Additionally, UC San Diego ranked #1 in Men's Water Polo and Men's Volleyball among NCAA D1 schools.

In all, the Tritons have won a total of 30 national championships in golf, soccer, softball, tennis, volleyball, and water polo. The 2006–07 season was marked as UC San Diego's best since moving to Division II, with 19 athletic programs qualifying for post-season competition, including 17 for the NCAA Championships. Eight of those teams finished with a top five national ranking.

Until 2007, UC San Diego was the only Division II school that did not offer athletic scholarships. In 2005, the NCAA created a rule that made it mandatory for all D-II programs to award athletic grants. Consequently, a measure was proposed to begin offering $500 "grants-in-aid" to all 600 intercollegiate athletes in order to meet this requirement. A student referendum was passed in February 2007, authorizing a $329 annual student fee to fund a raise in coaches' salaries, hire more trainers, and provide all athletes with a $500 scholarship.

The athletic department considered a move to Division I in 2011. The student body would have needed to approve a doubling of student fees to allow the university to meet minimum scholarship requirements for D-I participation. However, students overwhelmingly rejected this measure in 2012, halting any efforts for a move to Division I at that time.

On May 24, 2016, students at UC San Diego passed the vote to move their athletics to NCAA Division I. The school's newspaper, The Guardian,'' reported that voter turnout was 35 percent of the undergraduate population, when the measure only needed 20 percent to pass.

The university offers 30 sports club teams, including badminton, baseball, cycling, dancesport, ice hockey, lacrosse, rugby, sailing, soccer, snow skiing, tennis, volleyball, ultimate, water polo, and waterskiing. The UC San Diego surf team has won the national championship six times and is consistently rated one of the best surfing programs in the United States. UC San Diego does not have a football team. However, the university participated in intercollegiate football for one year during the 1968 season. The newly recruited Tritons lost all seven games that they played.

Alumni

See also 
 TRI-D (rocket engine)
 S*, a collaboration between seven universities and the Karolinska Institutet for training in bioinformatics and genomics

Notes

References

External links

 
 UC San Diego Athletics website

 
San Diego
University of California, San Diego
UCSD
UCSD
UCSD
Schools accredited by the Western Association of Schools and Colleges
Educational institutions established in 1960
1960 establishments in California